Samuel Troy Pellom (born October 2, 1951) is a retired American basketball player born in Wilmington, North Carolina. The 6'9" forward-center played professionally for the Atlanta Hawks and the Milwaukee Bucks of the NBA and played college basketball at the University at Buffalo, and is to date the only player from that university's basketball team who ever played in the NBA. Pellom also played for the Washington Generals, the team that plays the Harlem Globetrotters.

References

External links

1951 births
Living people
American expatriate basketball people in Argentina
American expatriate basketball people in France
American expatriate basketball people in Spain
American men's basketball players
Atlanta Hawks players
Basketball players from North Carolina
Buffalo Bulls men's basketball players
CB Breogán players
Centers (basketball)
Lancaster Lightning players
Liga ACB players
Milwaukee Bucks players
Power forwards (basketball)
Sportspeople from Wilmington, North Carolina
Undrafted National Basketball Association players
Union Tours Basket Métropole players
Washington Generals players